The San Jose Rhinos were an inline hockey team in Roller Hockey International from 1994-97 and 1999 (the RHI did not operate in 1998).  In its second year, the team won the Murphy Cup with a victory over the Montreal Roadrunners in the championship series. The team played its home games at the San Jose Arena.

References

External links
San Jose Rhinos Stats and History

Roller Hockey International teams
Sports clubs established in 1994
Rhinos